Cagua is a city of Venezuela, capital of the Sucre Municipality of Aragua State. Cagua is part of the metropolitan area of Maracay

It may also refer to:

Cagua language, one of the Spurious languages See list
Cagua Volcano, a stratovolcano located in the Philippine province of Cagayan
Jhon Cagua, Ecuadorean footballer

See also
Caguas (disambiguation)